The Xinyi–Changxing railway or Xinchang railway, also known as the Xinchang line, is a single-track railway line in eastern China between the cities of Xinyi in Jiangsu Province and Changxing County in Zhejiang Province. It runs north-south through the entire length of Jiangsu Province and the northern tip of Zhejiang. Major cities along route include Huai'an, Yancheng, Hai'an, Jingjiang, Jiangyin and Yixing.  Including a 62.5 km spur from Hai'an to Nantong, the Xinchang railway is 638 km in total length. It used a train ferry to cross the Yangtze River, but this closed in 2019.  Passenger services south of Hai'an have also been abandoned.

History
The Xinchang railway was the first railway to be built in Jiangsu Province north of the Yangtze River.  Construction began in September 1998 and the entire line was completed in April 2005. Passenger and freight service commenced on July 1, 2005. A connection to Nantong (a section of the Nanjing–Qidong railway) was added in 2008. The train ferry closed on 16 December 2019. Passenger services south of Hai'an have also been abandoned.

Route
The Xinchang railway connects with the Longhai and Jiaozhou–Xinyi railways in the north and with the Nanjing–Nantong, Beijing–Shanghai, Xuancheng–Hangzhou railways in the south.

Until 2019, the Xinchang line was the only major inland rail line in China to use a river ferry.  As the railway has no bridge or tunnel crossing at the Yangtze River, trains had to be ferried across the river from Jingjiang on the northern side of the river (terminal at ) to Jiangyin on the southern side (terminal at ). At its peak, a pair of ferries made 48 trips per day across the river.

Notes

Railway lines in China
Rail transport in Jiangsu
Rail transport in Zhejiang
Railway lines opened in 2005